Noureddine Yazid Zerhouni (1937  – 18 December 2020) was the interior minister of Algeria. He was born in Tunis. In 2000, he was hospitalized in Algeria, Algiers with an undisclosed condition. and died in Algiers on 18 December 2020.

Honours
 Grand Cordon of the Order of the Rising Sun (2018)

References

1937 births
2020 deaths
People from Tunis
Interior ministers of Algeria
Grand Cordons of the Order of the Rising Sun
Algerian intelligence agency personnel
Directors of intelligence agencies
21st-century Algerian people